Georges Pitoëff (Russian: Георгий Питоев; 4 September 1884 – 17 September 1939) was a Russian émigré with an Armenian background who became one of the leading actors and directors in France.

Early life and education
Pitoëff was born on 4 September 1884 in Tiflis, Russia (now Tbilisi, Georgia) to Russian-born of Armenian origins, he was the son of the Director of the Tiflis Theatre. After studying and graduating in law at Paris University, he switched his focus to a career in the theatre.

Career 
In Russia, Pitoëff trained with Konstantin Stanislavski.:45 In France he became a theatre director and producer, noted for his popularization of the works of contemporary playwrights, especially George Bernard Shaw, Anton Chekhov, Arthur Schnitzler, Henrik Ibsen, and Eugene O'Neill. He was a founding member of the Cartel des Quatre (Group of Four), a group including Louis Jouvet, Charles Dullin, and Gaston Baty, dedicated to rejuvenating the French theatre.

Death 
Pitoëff died on 17 September 1939 in Bellevue, near Geneva, Switzerland.

Family 
One of his sons, Alexandre, known as Sacha Pitoëff, was himself a noted French theatre director and actor.

References

Further reading 
 Jomarron, Jacqueline. Thèâtre Des Années Vingt: Georges Pitoëff metteur en scène. Lausanne, Switzerland: L'age D'homme publishers, 1979
 Pitoëff, Aniouta. Ludmilla, Ma Mère: The Life of Ludmilla and Georges Pitoëff. Paris, France: Juillard publishers, 1955.

External links
 

1884 births
1939 deaths
Chevaliers of the Légion d'honneur
French male stage actors
French male film actors
French male silent film actors
French theatre directors
Russian Christians
White Russian emigrants to France
20th-century French male actors
Imperial Moscow University alumni